The 2016 National League speedway season was the third tier/division of British speedway.

Summary
The title was won by Birmingham Brummies.

Final league table

League scoring system
Home draw = 1
Home win by any number of points = 3
Away loss by 6 points or less = 1
Away draw = 2
Away win by between 1 and 6 points = 3
Away win by 7 points or more = 4

Play-offs

National League Knockout Cup
The 2016 National League Knockout Cup was the 19th edition of the Knockout Cup for tier three teams. Eastbourne Eagles were the winners for the second successive year.

First round

Quarter-finals

Semi-finals

Final

Riders & averages
Final Leading averages

Belle Vue Colts
Matt Williamson 9.49 
Dan Bewley 8.65
Lee Payne 8.11 
Rob Shuttleworth 6.60
Tom Woolley 4.90
Andy Mellish 3.21
David Holt 3.00
Joe Lawlor 3.00

Birmingham Brummies
Zach Wajtknecht 8.59 
Tom Perry
Tom Bacon 7.95
Danyon Hume 7.33
Darryl Ritchings 7.04
Jack Parkinson-Blackburn 6.97
Jack Smith 6.32

Buxton Hitmen
Oliver Greenwood 8.00
Ben Hopwood 8.00
Jade Mudgway 7.62
Ryan Blacklock 5.93
Lee Dicken 5.87
Steven Jones 4.96
Shelby Rutherford 4.45
Ryan Burton 3.37
David Wallinger 3.32
David Speight 3.06
Lee Geary 3.00

Coventry Storm
Mitchell Davey 8.43
Liam Carr 7.71
Dan Greenwood 6.82
Martin Knuckey 6.07
Ryan Terry-Daley 4.55
Connor Dwyer 4.05
Jamie Halder 3.57
Callum Walker 3.45

Cradley Heathens
Max Clegg 10.08
Ashley Morris 9.77
Luke Chessell 8.09
Jack Kingston 5.84
Richard Andrews 4.26
James Purchase 3.59
Ben Basford 3.09
Bradley Andrews 3.07

Eastbourne Eagles
Adam Ellis 10.98
Kyle Hughes 8.67
Ellis Perks 8.25
Jake Knight 8.53
Ben Hopwood 8.00
Georgie Wood 7.62
Richard Andrews 5.18
Gary Cottham 4.70
Charley Powell 4.05
Luke Harris 3.95
Nick Phillips 3.00

Isle of Wight Islanders
Benji Compton 8.95
Joe Jacobs 8.63
Mark Baseby 7.73
James Cockle 7.35
Nathan Stoneman 6.98
Lee Smart 5.71
Chris Widman 4.45
Kelsey Dugard 4.28 
Layne Cupitt 3.00
George Piper 3.00 
Brendan Johnson 6.21
Matt Saul 3.00
Nick Phillips 3.00
Tyler Govier 3.30

Kent Kings
Luke Bowen 9.42
Danny Ayres 8.56
James Shanes 8.53
Dave Mason 6.54
Jack Thomas 5.83
Danno Verge 4.43
Luke Clifton 4.22

King's Lynn Young Stars
Josh Bailey 8.48
Nathan Greaves 8.36
Tom Stokes 7.61
Scott Campos 6.35 
Shane Hazelden 5.42 
Ryan Kinsley 5.39  
Taylor Hampshire 3.00 
Lewis Whitmore 3.00 
Lewis Austin 3.00
Layne Cupitt 3.00 

Mildenhall Fen Tigers
Connor Mountain 8.73
Kyle Hughes 8.67
Daniel Halsey 8.64
Jon Armstrong 7.82
Connor Coles 7.11
Alfie Bowtell 4.21
Chris Widman 4.15
Jordan Jenkins 3.00
Luke Ruddick 3.10
Robert Parker 3.00

Rye House Raiders
Robert Branford 9.98
Ben Morley 9.22 
Luke Priest 8.33
Ben Hopwood 8.00
George Hunter 4.00 
Matt Saul 3.00
Connor Locke 3.00 
Macauley Leek 3.00 
Sam Woods 3.00
Harvie Banks 3.00 
Kenny Bowdery 3.00

Stoke Potters
Ben Wilson 8.50
Tony Atkin 7.16
Danny Phillips 6.25
Ben Hopwood 5.83
Shaun Tedham 3.93
Chris Widman 3.47
Paul Burnett 3.46
Chris Hay 3.23
Lewis Millar 3.00
Ryan MacDonald 3.00
David Morgan 3.00

Development Leagues

Midland Development League
Group A

Group B

Northern Junior League

See also
List of United Kingdom Speedway League Champions
Knockout Cup (speedway)

References

National League
National League (speedway)
Speedway National League